Dubé is a French surname, commonly found in Quebec. Dube is also a common surname among the Zulu and Ndebele peoples of Southern Africa. Notable people with the surname Dubé or Dube include:

Journalism
 Michelle Dubé, Canadian news anchor
 Jonathan Dube, online journalist
 Phesheya Dube, Swazi journalist

Musicians
 Jean Dubé (musician) (born 1981), French pianist
 Lucky Philip Dube (1964-2007), South African reggae musician

Politicians
 Antoine Dubé  (born 1947), Quebec member of the Canadian House of Commons
 Christian Dubé (politician) (born 1956), Quebec MNA
 Claire L'Heureux-Dubé (born 1927), justice on the Supreme Court of Canada
 Fernand Dubé (1928–1999), New Brunswick politician
 Jabulani Dube (died 2013), Zimbabwean politician
 Jean F. Dubé (born 1962), New Brunswick member of the Canadian House of Commons and businessman
 Jean-Eudes Dubé (born 1926), member of the Prime Minister's Cabinet and Canadian House of Commons
 John Langalibalele Dube (1871–1946), South African politician and a founding member of the ANC
 Madeleine Dubé (born 1961), New Brunswick social worker and politician
 Mildred Reason Dube (died 2022), Zimbabwean politician
 Ramesh Dube (born 1942), Indian politician

Sports
 Christian Dubé (ice hockey) (born 1977), Canadian National Hockey League player
 Dillon Dubé (born 1998), Canadian ice hockey player
 Glody Dube (born 1978), Botswana Olympic 800m runner
 Jessica Dubé (born 1987), Canadian figure skater
 Joe Dube (born 1944), American Olympic weightlifter
 Ndaba Dube (born 1959), Zimbabwean bantamweight Olympic boxer
 Thamsanqa Dube, Zimbabwean heavyweight boxing champion

Other people
 Alexa-Jeanne Dubé, Canadian actress and filmmaker
 Desmond Dube, South African entertainer
 Manon Dubé (1967–1978), Canadian murder victim
 Nothando Dube (1987–2019), 12th wife of Mswati III of Eswatini
 Saurabh Dube (born 1960), Indian scholar

See also
Dwivedi or Dube, an Indian Brahmin surname

Zimbabwean surnames
Zulu-language surnames